The YJ-91 is an anti-radiation air-to-surface cruise missile produced by the People's Republic of China. It is a derivative of the Zvezda-Strela Kh-31P anti-radiation variant.

The YJ-91A is the anti-ship variant.

Operators

People's Liberation Army Air Force
People's Liberation Army Naval Air Force

References

Citations

Bibliography

Guided missiles of the People's Republic of China
Anti-ship cruise missiles of the People's Republic of China
Air-to-surface missiles
Anti-radiation missiles of the People's Republic of China
Military equipment introduced in the 1990s